Bhandari Devi temple is an ancient Hindu temple located about 4 km north of Ahraura, which is about 44 km. from Varanasi, 63 km from Mirzapur in Chandauli District of U.P., India.
This temple is preserved by then Landlord Shri Shrinivas Pandey and now it has been maintained by their ancestors.
Beside this temple there is a stone carving of King Ashoka which is preserved by Archeological Survey of India .

Ancient historical belief 

It is believed that the sister (who later came to be known as Bhandari Devi) of King Karnpal Singh, after her brother's death started to live here. She started a charity kitchen (Bhandara) for the needy ones, hence got the name Bhandari Devi. The present site used to be a citadel of the demon called Bhandodari and his clan, who was later killed by Bhandari Devi. Presently Bhandari Devi, through a ritual, is made to visit 'Shiv Pahar', her parents home every third year in a palanquin procession. Anyone can make a wish by offering one or five stone pieces in the temple and on being granted the wish the stones are removed. 
Inscriptions of Ashoka period have been recovered from the temple premises. King Ashoka, while on his conquest march is supposed to have taken a night rest here. He liked the peace & tranquility of the place. His views pertaining to this place are inscribed on a stone piece in Pali language, between the inscriptions there are figures of birds & horses.

References 

 

Devi temples in Indiaमाता भंडारी देवी – अहरौरा [Mata Bhandari Devi temple- Ahraura]
Hindu temples in Uttar Pradesh
Chandauli district